Edmund Nelson Carpenter (June 27, 1865 – November 4, 1952) was a Republican member of the U.S. House of Representatives from Pennsylvania.

Edmund N. Carpenter was born in Wilkes-Barre, Pennsylvania. His parents were Benjamin Gardner Carpenter and Sarah Ann Feld and he was one of five children. He is a descendant of the immigrant William Carpenter (1605 England – 1658/1659 Rehoboth, Massachusetts) the founder of the Rehoboth Carpenter family who came to America in the mid-1630s.

He attended the Wyoming Seminary in Kingston, Pennsylvania. He was interested in mining and the manufacture of sheet-metal products. He enlisted as a private in 1893 and attained the rank of major in the Pennsylvania National Guard. During the Spanish–American War, Carpenter served as first lieutenant and quartermaster in the Ninth Regiment of the Pennsylvania Volunteer Infantry, from 1898 to 1898. He was an unsuccessful candidate for election in 1918.

Carpenter was elected as a Republican to the Sixty-ninth Congress.  He was an unsuccessful candidate for reelection in 1926. He resumed his manufacturing interests, and died in Philadelphia, Pennsylvania. Interment in Hollenback Cemetery in Wilkes-Barre.

See also

 List of United States representatives from Pennsylvania

References

Sources
 Retrieved on 2008-02-10
The Political Graveyard

External links
 

1865 births
1952 deaths
American military personnel of the Spanish–American War
Politicians from Philadelphia
Politicians from Wilkes-Barre, Pennsylvania
United States Army officers
Quartermasters
Republican Party members of the United States House of Representatives from Pennsylvania